The 2015 North American, Central American and Caribbean Championships was a regional track and field competition held at the Estadio Nacional de Costa Rica in San José, Costa Rica  from August 7-9, 2015. It was the second edition of a senior track and field championship for the NACAC region, held eight years after the first.

Medal summary

Complete results were published.

Men

Women

Participating nations
According to an unofficial count, 369 athletes from 31 countries participated.

References

Results
II NACAC Senior T&F Championships.

External links
Official NACAC website

NACAC Championships
2015 in Costa Rican sport
2015 in Central American sport
International athletics competitions hosted by Costa Rica
NACAC Championships in Athletics